Preston Crowmarsh is a hamlet in Benson civil parish in South Oxfordshire. The river can be crossed on foot here at Benson Lock.

External links

Villages in Oxfordshire